Murashinsky District is an administrative and municipal district (raion), one of the thirty-nine in Kirov Oblast, Russia. It is located in the north of the oblast. Its administrative center is the town of Murashi. As of the 2010 Census, the total population of the district was 12,905, with the population of Murashi accounting for 52.3% of that number.

History
The district was established on July 10, 1929 within Vyatka Okrug of Nizhny Novgorod Krai from the parts of former Kazakovskaya and Pinyuzhanskaya Volosts of Orlovsky Uyezd. It 1934, the district became a part of Kirov Krai (which was transformed into modern Kirov Oblast in 1936).

References

Notes

Sources

Districts of Kirov Oblast
States and territories established in 1929
